Tommaso Bai, or Tommaso Baj, was born in Crevalcore around 1650 and died in Rome on 22 December 1714. He was an Italian conductor, composer, and tenor at the Vatican. He is most well known for his Miserere, which is associated with Gregorio Allegri's Miserere. During the last years of his life he had been the Kapellmeister of the Cappella Giulia in Rome.

Biography 
In the year of 1670 he joined the Choir of the Cappella Giulia and stayed there until his dying day. He also advanced to become a personal singer of the pope. He served the following superiors, who had been his predecessors as the Kapellmeister of the Cappella Giulia:
 Orazio Benevoli (1646–1672)
 Ercole Bernabei (1672–1674)
 Antonio Masini (1674–1678)
 Don Francesco Berretta (1678–1694)
 Paolo Lorenzani (1694–1713)
In 1713 he got to be the Kapellmeister. He kept this function until his dying day. There are different opinions about this date; for example in a music sheet of his Virgo gloriosa  - owned by a person called Haberl  - his date of death is claimed to be 1717. According to Baini he died at the 22th December 1714.

Works 
Bai was acclaimed for his intricate attention to prosody, accentuation of words, and notation. His well known Miserere, which he composed in 1713, is claimed by some opinions to be an imitation Gregorio Allegri's Miserere. According to Eitner this Miserere, that is performed during the Easter day, consists of two parts; the first part is written for 5 voices and it had been composed by Allegri and the second part written for four voices origininates of Baj [originally by Eitner 1905: Der 1. Chor zu 5 Stim., ist von Allegri und der 2. Chor zu 4 Stim. von Bai. (Capella sistina Kat. p. 50. B, B., L 24. B. Joach. Bei'lin Singak. Lübeck. Schwerin F. inkompl. Hofb. Wien 15926, 2. Musikfr. Wien. Bologna.— printed in Choron, Burney and Lugano 1840.)].

Furthermore, there exist the following compositions (quotation after Eitner):
 Miserere 4voices, performed as described above in sequence with the Miserere by Allegri (s. u.)
 Virgo gloriosa, (Haberl, privately, see above))
 Miserere 8 voc. fecit 1700. Ms. 16690
 Missa super Ut re mi fa, 5 voc. in P. — T 39 allerlei Gesge. in P. — "W. 17 Nr. 81 obige Messe in P".
 Mss. in B. M.
 2 Messen zu 5 Stkn., 1 Miserere zu 5 Stim, and 13 Motetten zu 4 u. 5 Stim, in P.
 Missa 5 voc., Ms. 16698 Nr. 13 in Hofb. Wien
 2 Motetten zu 4 Stim, in P: Serve bone and Dne. quando veneris, Ms. Bd. 158 in Breslau Kircheninstit.
 1 Gesg. in alter Hds., P. in Brüssel 1854
 further pieces of mucic, printed later on.

Further reading 
 Robert Eitner: Biographisch-bibliographisches Quellen-Lexikon der Musiker und Musikgelehrten der christlichen Zeitrechnung bis zur Mitte des neunzehnten Jahrhunderts
 Giancarlo Rostirolla: La Cappella Giulia 1513–2013: Cinque secoli di musica sacra in San Pietro.
 G. Gaspari, Catal. d. Bibl. del Liceo Musicale di Bologna, II, Bologna 1892, S. 174; III, ibid. 1893, S. 6
 F. J. Fétis, Biogr. univ. des musiciens, I, Paris 1860, S. 225 ff.
 Die Musik in Geschichte und Gegenwart, I, col. 1092
 Dizionario Ricordi della musica e dei musicisti, Milano 1959, S. 92.

References 

Year of birth uncertain
1714 deaths
Italian conductors (music)
17th-century Italian composers
18th-century Italian composers
People from Crevalcore